Triendoceras is a genus of fairly large endocerid named by Flower (1958), included in the Endoceratidae by Teichert (1964), characterized by a holochoanitic ventral siphuncle in which the cross section through the endocones has an opening in the shape of an isosceles triangle with a sharp apex (corner) pointing down. Triendoceras is found in the upper Lower Ordovician of Quebec and New York in North America and possibly in Ohio, and in eastern Europe.  The type species is T. montrealense.

References
Flower, R. H 1958, Some Chazyan and Mohawkian Endoceratida, Jour Paleon V 32, No 2, pp 433–458, May 1858
Teichert, Curt 1964. Endoceratoidea;  Treatise on Invertebrate Paleontology, Part K Mollusca 3; Geol Soc of America and University of Kansas Press

Nautiloids
Prehistoric nautiloid genera
Paleozoic life of Quebec